Regular Show is an American  animated sitcom  created by J. G. Quintel for Cartoon Network that aired from September 6, 2010 to January 16, 2017. The series revolves around the daily lives of two 23-year-old friends, Mordecai (a blue jay), and Rigby (a raccoon). They work as groundskeepers at a park, and spend their days trying to slack off and entertain themselves by any means. This is much to the chagrin of their boss Benson (a gumball machine) and their coworker Skips (a yeti), but to the delight of park manager Pops (a man with a lollipop-shaped head). Their other coworkers, Muscle Man (an overweight green man) and Hi-Five Ghost (a ghost with a hand extending from the top of his head) serve as their rivals.

Quintel initially worked as a writer and staff director for the Cartoon Network series Camp Lazlo and The Marvelous Misadventures of Flapjack before he was offered to produce a short for the network's showcase project The Cartoonstitute. Quintel developed the Regular Show pilot for the project, utilizing characters from his California Institute of the Arts student films The Naïve Man from Lolliland (2005) and 2 in the AM PM (2006). While The Cartoonstitute was ultimately scrapped, Cartoon Network executives approved the production of Regular Show, starting with its first season. Its first two seasons were rating successes, with Nielsen Media Research ranking the series at number one in its time period amongst its primary demographic. As of May 2013, the program averages approximately 2 to 2.5 million viewers each week.

Regular Show received positive reviews from critics and has been noted for its appeal towards different age groups, simplistic animation style, and frequent references to 1980s popular culture. It has attained four Primetime Emmy Award nominations, including a win in the Short-format Animation category for the 2012 third season episode "Eggscellent". The series has also been nominated for two Annie Awards, as well as three BAFTA Children's Awards. The eighth and final season was announced by Cartoon Network on July 7, 2015. A film adaptation, Regular Show: The Movie, premiered on November 25, 2015. After eight successful seasons and 261 episodes, Regular Show concluded on January 16, 2017, with "A Regular Epic Final Battle".

Series overview

Early shorts (2005–06)
J. G. Quintel created two shorts while in college with characters that resemble the present cast.

Episodes

Pilot (2009)

Season 1 (2009-2010)

Season 2 (2010–11)

Season 3 (2011–12)

Season 4 (2012–13)

Season 5 (2013–14)

Season 6 (2014–15)

Season 7 (2015–16)

Season 8 (2016–17)

Film

Shorts

Season 2 short

Season 6 shorts
These shorts' production code takes up one production code of season 6.

Season 7 shorts
These shorts' production code takes up one production code of season 7.

Season 8 shorts
These shorts' production code take up one production code of season 8.

References

External links
 Official page for Regular Show at Cartoon Network
 
 Regular Show at epguides

Lists of American children's animated television series episodes
Lists of American sitcom episodes
 
Lists of Cartoon Network television series episodes
2010s television-related lists